Racta is a genus of grass skippers in the butterfly family Hesperiidae.

Species
These species belong to the genus Racta:
 Racta apella Schaus, 1913
 Racta plasma Evans, 1955
 Racta racta Evans, 1955

References

Natural History Museum Lepidoptera genus database

Hesperiini
Hesperiidae genera